The Kyrgyz Railway (KTJ) is the national railway developer of Kyrgyzstan.

Track Network and Rolling Stock
Kyrgyz Railway operates about 320 km of single track lines (with a total track length of 428 km). After the Soviet Union broke up, Kyrgyz Railways obtained 2,500 freight cars, 450 passenger cars and 50 locomotives from the Soviet railways. However, the 1998 financial crisis drastically reduced spending on the railways.

Traffic
Freight traffic is now only 13% of its 1990 level, 330 million tkm in 2001, compared to 2,620 million tkm in 1990 and is still falling. Passenger traffic is only about 25% of what it was in 1990. While freight services are profitable, passenger services are losing money, since fares are regulated by the Anti-Monopoly Committee,  and travel is due to long distances and slow railways partly taken over by air travel. Also, the line which once linked Bishkek and Osh became untenable once the complex post-Soviet borders in the Fergana Valley became less permeable in the later 1990s: the 'domestic' route had looped around through Tashkent (Uzbekistan) and Khujand (Tajikistan) crossing newly internationalized frontiers nine times.

Electrification
In 2008 it was announced that work will commence on the electrification of the line which connects the capital Bishkek with the Kazakhstan railway network.  work has not begun yet.

Rail links with adjacent countries
Kazakhstan - yes - Bishkek branch - same gauge
Uzbekistan - yes - Osh branch - same gauge
Tajikistan - no - same gauge
China - no - Break of gauge /

See also
Transport in Kyrgyzstan

References

External links 

 Image gallery
 Kyrgyz Railways Official Site

Rail transport in Kyrgyzstan